Jason Copping  is a Canadian politician who has served as the minister of health for Alberta since September 21, 2021. Elected in the 2019 Alberta general election to represent the electoral district of Calgary-Varsity, Copping is a member of the United Conservative Party (UCP). He previously served as the labour and immigration minister from April 20, 2019 to September 21, 2021.

Background 
Before his election to the Legislature, Copping worked in the transportation sector as a human resources and labour relations manager. He holds a Master of Industrial Relations (MIR) from Queen’s University and a master's degree in law with a specialization in labour and employment law from Osgoode Hall, York University.

Political career 
Copping was elected as a member of the Legislative Assembly (MLA) following the 2019 election, representing the United Conservative Party. Copping served as minister of labour and immigration from 2019 to 2021, before he was named minister of health in 2021, swapping portfolios with Tyler Shandro, who then took over as labour minister.

On January 17, 2022, Copping announced that he had tested positive for COVID-19.

Electoral history

References

United Conservative Party MLAs
Living people
21st-century Canadian politicians
Politicians from Calgary
Year of birth missing (living people)
Members of the Executive Council of Alberta